Nesgrenda is a village in Tvedestrand municipality in Agder county, Norway. The Næs jernverk (iron works) facility is located in the village.

References

Villages in Agder
Tvedestrand